The 2 arrondissements of the Tarn department are:
 Arrondissement of Albi, (prefecture of the Tarn department: Albi) with 163 communes. The population of the arrondissement was 191,150 in 2016.  
 Arrondissement of Castres, (subprefecture: Castres) with 151 communes.  The population of the arrondissement was 195,298 in 2016.

History

In 1800 the arrondissements of Albi, Castres, Gaillac and Lavaur were established. The arrondissements of Gaillac and Lavaur were disbanded in 1926.

References

Tarn